Acacia Valley is a valley in the Canadian province of Nova Scotia, located in The Municipality of the District of Digby in Digby County in the Hillgrove area .

References
Hillgrove on Destination Nova Scotia
Acacia Valley
Acacia Valley,1913

Communities in Digby County, Nova Scotia